Pseudochama cristella, or the left-handed jewel box clam, is a species of bivalve mollusc in the family Chamidae. It can be found along the Atlantic coast of North America, ranging from southern Florida to the West Indies.

References

Chamidae
Bivalves described in 1819